The 2000–01 OB I bajnokság season was the 64th season of the OB I bajnokság, the top level of ice hockey in Hungary. Eight teams participated in the league, and Alba Volan Szekesfehervar won the championship.

First round

Second round

Group A

Group B

Playoffs

7th place 
 Miskolci JJE - Tisza Volán HC Szeged 2:1 (4:5, 7:1, 5:0 Forfeit)

3rd place 
 Ferencvárosi TC - Újpesti TE 7:4

Final 
 Dunaferr SE Dunaújváros - Alba Volán Székesfehérvár 1:4 (2:1 SO, 2:5, 2:6, 1:3, 3:5)

External links
 Season on hockeyarchives.info

OB I bajnoksag seasons
Hun
OB